Live at Wembley is a video album by American singer Beyoncé. It was released on April 26, 2004, by Sony Urban Music and Columbia Music Video. The DVD features her concert at Wembley Arena in London, as part of her Dangerously in Love Tour in support of her debut solo studio album Dangerously in Love (2003). Most of the songs on Live at Wembley originate from Dangerously in Love, although Beyoncé also performed a medley of past songs by her former group Destiny's Child. Live at Wembley was critically acclaimed, with AllMusic giving it a grade of three-and-a-half stars out of five. The cover of Rose Royce's "Wishing on a Star", included on the album, was nominated in the category for Best Female R&B Vocal Performance at the 48th Annual Grammy Awards (2006).

The album debuted at number 17 on the US Billboard 200, selling 45,000 copies in its first week. It also charted on the US Billboard Top R&B/Hip-Hop Albums at number eight. Live at Wembley managed to top the DVD charts in the United States, Australia and Spain and peaked within the top 10 in Austria, Belgium, Netherlands, Italy and the United Kingdom. The DVD was certified double platinum by the Australian Recording Industry Association (ARIA) and the Recording Industry Association of America (RIAA). The album was also certified gold by the Recording Industry Association of Japan (RIAJ).

Background and development

Live at Wembley was filmed at the London's Wembley Arena show of the Dangerously in Love Tour, Beyoncé's first international solo tour, on November 10, 2003. The tour supported her debut solo album, Dangerously in Love (2003). Most of the songs on Live at Wembley originate from that album, but it also contains a medley of past songs by her former group Destiny's Child and two soundtrack singles: "Work It Out" and "Summertime". The second disc of Live at Wembley contains three previously unreleased studio recorded songs, including a cover of Rose Royce's "Wishing on a Star", and one remix each of "Crazy in Love", "Baby Boy" and "Naughty Girl". Behind-the-scenes footage can be also seen on the DVD.

The concert audio was mixed by Rick Camp, the same engineer who mixed at the concert venues. It is uncommon for mix engineers to specialize in both live and recorded mixing. For Camp, "Mixing Beyoncé is a pleasure because she's a real singer and makes it easy. There is hardly an overdub on this project — it's 95 percent live Beyoncé." He further talked about the collaboration with Beyoncé with Mix magazine, saying: "In my 22 years of mixing, I've never come across anyone who could deliver like she does: vocally and her ability to do a show. I've seen this young woman run across a 60-foot stage, hit every note and never miss a thing. And that makes my job so much easier."

Show synopsis
On stage, Beyoncé was backed by several male and female dancers performing choreography during the show. DJ Diamond who served as a DJ during the performances and a backing band provided the music. The performance starts with footage of the crowd during the concert cheering before the appearance of Beyoncé. The curtains are lifted to reveal the stage and Beyoncé appears in red clothes hanging upside down while being taken to a sofa on the stage with a harness singing "Baby Boy". She is backed by a big screen and several dancers on stage who perform a choreography around her. She later starts dancing with them as the song plays and a breakdown towards the end is also featured. She asks from the girls in the crowd to sing to "Naughty Girl" as she dances with background dancers while the words "Naughty Girl" are displayed on the screen behind her. Towards the end of the song she performs portions of Vanity 6's song "Nasty Girl" (1982) as a short dance break. The lights are turned off and later silhouettes of Beyoncé and her dancers appear performing a choreography in front of the screen which is colored white while a backing track is played. She continues to perform a cover version of Little Willie John's song "Fever" wearing white pieces of wardrobe backed by four male dancers. The words "Pure Players" start appearing on the screen as a man's voice says them and "Hip Hop Star" is performed next with Big Boi's and Sleepy Brown's vocals played on a backing track while Beyoncé performs a choreography with several background dancers. "Yes" is performed with Beyoncé and her female dancers dancing on a fence. "Work It Out" follows and Beyoncé tells the fans that she's going to "slow it down" for the performance of "Gift from Virgo" as she hangs in the air on a yellow curtain wearing a yellow dress. In the middle of the song, she is taken down to the stage where she continues to perform the song.

She continues telling to the crowd that she would sing a song from Dangerously in Love further asking the attendees how many of them have the album. She then introduces "Be with You" as one of her favorite slow jams and starts singing it. For the beginning of "Speechless" she sits on a chair singing the song. She asks the fans in the arena to cheer and announced "Well, this is my very first solo tour as an artist and I'm very happy to share this wonderful experience with you all tonight in London". She then starts performing a short Destiny's Child medley beginning with "Bug a Boo". Beyoncé then tells the story about the group's first single "No, No, No Part 2" and continues performing the song. "Bootylicious", "Jumpin' Jumpin'", "Say My Name", "Independent Women Part I", "'03 Bonnie & Clyde" and "Survivor" are performed afterwards as part of the medley. She introduces the next song "Me, Myself and I" saying that she wrote it for all the ladies, "I thought it was something we all need to hear. When we get in these relationships they don't work out. Sometimes we blame the man, we blame another girl, we blame ourselves. But I think we should take every experience and learn a lesson out of it, even the bad experiences and I want all the ladies to know that we will never disappoint ourselves. You'll always have yourself." She introduces the next song "Summertime" as one of her favorite songs asking from the crowd to dance further performing a step dance while footage of flowers was projected on the screen. The lights go out again and Beyoncé appears wearing a grey, sparkly dress for an extended performance of "Dangerously in Love" surrounded by smoke. After the word "Beyoncé" is written on the screen several times, she appears on a staircase wearing a long shirt as the opening lines of "Crazy in Love" start and the song's music video is projected on the screen. Beyoncé then continues singing the song and performing its choreography with her female background dancers and confetti are dropped on stage during the end of the performance.

Release and promotion
Live at Wembley premiered at Regal Entertainment Group cinemas around the United States on April 26, 2004. Tickets for the theater premieres were purchasable by members of the public. The album was released by Sony Music Entertainment and RCA Records in Europe the same day, and by Columbia Music Video in United States the following day. It was released in both CD and DVD formats. On August 17, 2010, Beyoncé's cover of "Wishing on a Star" was released as a promotional single through several online digital retailers. It peaked at number one on the Bubbling Under R&B/Hip-Hop Singles and number 28 on the US Adult R&B Airplay chart. At the 48th Grammy Awards held on February 8, 2006, at the Staples Center in Los Angeles, California, the cover received a nomination for Best Female R&B Vocal Performance.

Critical reception

Website AllMusic graded the album with three-and-a-half stars out of five. A writer further praised the CD of the album, writing that "a fun, late-1970s/early-'80s vibe pervades the record". The writer added that the album "opens with a sexy cover of... 'Wishing on a Star'... 'What's It Gonna Be' drips honeyed harmonies over a funky beat, while 'My First Time' falls somewhere between Rufus and Shalamar, with its dreamy '80s-funk-fueled R&B." He further praised the soulful slow-tempo remix version of "Crazy in Love" and the high-powered techno reworking of "Baby Boy". The DVD was also included in Vibe magazine's list of "Get in Tune With New Music" in June 2004. In an interview with The New York Times in 2007, American singer Miranda Lambert stated that she admired Beyoncé's performance in Live at Wembley, saying "The charisma and the confidence — she's the ultimate diva." She further revealed that the album inspired her to "take little bits from that [Beyoncé's performance] for her live shows."

Commercial performance
Live at Wembley debuted at number 17 on the US Billboard 200, selling 45,000 copies in its first week. The DVD was certified double platinum by the Recording Industry Association of America (RIAA) for shipping 200,000 copies to retailers inside the United States. According to Nielsen SoundScan, it had sold 264,000 copies in the United States by October 2007, while as of October 6, 2010, it has sold 197,000 digital downloads. Live at Wembley entered the Schweizer Hitparade Albums Chart in Switzerland on May 16, 2004, at number 73, and moved to number 89 the following week, before dropping out of the chart. The album spent one week on the AFP Albums Chart in Portugal at number 26. It also spent four weeks in the German Albums Chart, peaking at number 59.

Live at Wembley peaked at number one on the Billboard Top Music Video chart in May 2004. The album debuted atop the ARIA DVD Chart in Australia the week ending on May 24, 2004, and remained in the chart for 32 weeks, dropping out in January 2005. It was certified double platinum by the Australian Recording Industry Association (ARIA) for selling 30,000 copies. Live at Wembley spent 20 weeks in the Oricon Albums Chart in Japan, peaking at number eight. On July 22, 2004, the album was certified gold by the Recording Industry Association of Japan (RIAJ), denoting shipment of 100,000 units. In Italy, the album appeared at number five on the FIMI DVD Chart ending April 4, 2010, but did not re-enter the chart. Live at Wembley became the third-best-selling music DVD in the world in 2004.

Track listing

Personnel
Credits adapted from liner notes and AllMusic.

Sharon Ali – producer, video producer
Zakari Asher – dancer
Bill Ashworth – camera operator
Carmit Bachar – dancer
Peter Barnes – lighting design
Alan Beechey – lighting technician
Ahmet Bekir – camera operator
Angela Beyincé – personal assistant
Beyoncé – creation
John Blow – editing
Daniel Boland – lighting director
Lanar Brantley – bass, music director
Charlie Bryan – camera operator
Lenora Dee Bryant – wardrobe
William Burke – Pro-Tools
Anthony Burrell – dance director, dancer
Kim Burse – creation, creative director
Anwar Burton – dancer
Alice Butts – package design
Thom Cadley – mixing, surround sound
Rick Camp – engineer
Shawn Carrington – guitar
Matt Cashman – camera operator
Justin Collie – lighting director
Mike Colucci – set construction
Annie Crofts – liner note producer
Mark Cruickshank – camera operator
Mark Davies – camera operator
Ceire Deery – production coordination
Milan Dillard – dancer
DJ Diamond – DJ
Richard Ellis – camera operator
Renece Fincher – dancer
Alan Floyd – tour manager
Aisha Francis – dance director, dancer
Michael Garabedian – set construction
Frank Gatson – choreographer, creation, staging
Danielle Green – production coordination
Brandon Henchel – dancer
Gerald Heyward – drums
Tim Highmoor – camera operator
Chris Hollier – camera operator
Adrian Homeshaw – camera operator
Tyrone"Ty" Hunter – assistant hair stylist, stylistic advisor
Chris Issacson – technician
Ed Jarman – video engineer
Paul Jarvis – camera operator
Scott Jenkins – camera operator
Harold Jones – production coordination
Pete Jones – sound recording
Chris Keating – video director
Julia Knowles – director, producer
Mathew Knowles – executive producer
Tina Knowles – stylist
Casper Leaver – camera operator
Melanie Lewis – dancer
Jim Littlehayles – camera operator
Sophie Lote – production coordination
Carl Lott – drum technician, guitar technician
Darragh McAuliffe – lighting technician
James "McGoo" McGregor – DJ, drum technician
Neil McLintock – camera operator
Nahum – director, editing
Kenneth Nash – monitor engineer
Naomi Neufeld – technical director
Vincent Perreux –  sound technician
Arthur Ross – camera operator
Mark Scott – engineer, sound recording
Rod Spicer – photography
Tim Summerhayes – audio supervisor
Horace Ward – engineer
Daniel Weatherspoon – keyboards
Mark Wilder – mastering
Joe "Flip" Wilson – keyboards

Charts

Weekly charts

Year-end charts

Certifications

Release history

References

External links

2004 live albums
2004 video albums
Beyoncé albums
Beyoncé video albums
Columbia Records live albums
Columbia Records video albums
Live albums recorded at Wembley Stadium
Live video albums
Albums produced by Beyoncé